Aristotel Stamatoiu (6 October 1929 – 28 March 2016) was a Romanian counterintelligence general and director of the Romanian Intelligence Service between 1984 and 1990.

He was born in Scoarța, Gorj County and attended high school in Târgu Jiu.

References

1929 births
2016 deaths
People from Gorj County